First Step is the debut studio album by the South Korean rock band CNBLUE. The album was released on March 21, 2011 in South Korea. The song "Intuition" was used as the title track. The album contains twelve songs, three new songs, eight Korean versions of their Japanese songs and one song from their Japanese album as bonus track. The album was re-released on April 7, 2011 in a Special Limited Edition with the same track list and an 80-pages photobook with making-of the music videos "Intuition" and "Love Girl".

Composition
The album contains Korean versions of songs which were previously released in Japanese. The songs "I Don't Know Why", "Lie", "One Time" and "Ready N Go" (previously titled "The Way part 1 ~One Time~" and "The Way part 2 ~Ready N Go~") from their second Japanese album 392, "Just Please" from their Japanese debut EP Now or Never, "Wanna Be Like U" and "One of a Kind" from their second Japanese EP Voice, and the song "Thank You" (previously titled "a.ri.ga.tou.") from their first Japanese album ThankU.

Music videos

"Intuition"
The first teaser of the music video for "Intuition" was released on March 6, 2011 on the CNBLUE's YouTube account. The second teaser was released a week after. The full music video was released on March 21, 2011, along with the album.

"Love Girl"
A teaser for the music video of "Love Girl" was released on April 21, 2011 and the full music video on April 25 on the CN Blue's YouTube account.

Promotion
The promotion of the title track "Intuition" started on March 24, on Mnet's show M! Countdown and was also promoted in the TV shows Music Bank, Music Core and Inkigayo. The songs "Love Follows the Rain", "Love Girl", "I Don't Know Why" and "Imagine" were used for the special comeback week performances. The song won 7 music show awards: 3 on M! Countdown, 3 on Music Bank and 1 on Inkigayo. To celebrate the "triple crown" on M! Countdown, the group made a special stage performance with the songs "Love Girl" and "Lie". The promotions of the song ended on April 24, on Inkigayo. They followed the promotions with the song "Love Girl" to promote the special EP First Step +1 Thank You, the first performance of the song was on April 29 on Music Bank. The promotions of the song and albums ended on May 22. The song "Intuition" placed at No.19 on KBS Music Bank Year End 2011 K-Chart.

Track listing

Chart performance

Sales

First Step +1 Thank You

"First Step +1 Thank You" is a special Korean EP released by the South Korean rock band CNBLUE. It is the third Korean EP of the group, but it's being counted as First Step's re-release album (repackage album). It was released on April 26, 2011 with the new version of the song "Love Girl" as the title track. The EP was released as a "thank you" gift for the fans who supported the group with their first studio album First Step. It comes with 4 songs, 3 Korean versions of their previous Japanese songs and a new arrangement version of the song "Love Girl" from their first studio album First Step.

Composition
This EP contains Korean versions of songs which were previously released in Japanese. Excluding "Love Girl", all the songs were previously released on their third Japanese indie single "Re-maintenance".

Track listing

Chart performance

Sales and certifications

Release history

References

External links
  
  
  on Warner Music Japan 
CNBLUE's weibo
CNBLUE's Twitter

2011 debut albums
CNBLUE albums
FNC Entertainment albums